Bobby Powell (born September 7, 1981) is a Democratic member of the Florida Senate who has represented the 30th district, which includes West Palm Beach and surrounding areas in northeastern Palm Beach County, since 2016. He previously served two terms in the Florida House of Representatives, representing the parts of the West Palm Beach area from 2012 to 2016.

History
Powell was born in Riviera Beach, and attended Florida A&M University, where he received his degree in public relations. He then attended Florida State University, receiving his master of science in planning. Powell then took a job working as the city planner of West Palm Beach in 2007, and then began as a legislative aide for State Representative Mack Bernard in 2009.

Florida House of Representatives
In 2012, Bernard declined to seek re-election so he could instead run for a seat in the Florida Senate, and the legislative districts in the state were redrawn, so Powell opted to run in the newly created 88th District. He faced Evelyn Garcia, Nikasha Wells, and Charles Bantel in the Democratic primary, and he earned the endorsement of The Palm Beach Post, which praised him for his "good record of community service" and for his familiarity with the district. Powell ended up defeating his opponents by a wide margin, winning 51% of the vote to Garcia's 24%, Wells's 17%, and Bantel's 8%, and advanced to the general election, where he was elected unopposed.

Entering the 2013 legislative session, Powell announced that his top three legislative priorities were allowing local governments to prohibit concealed weapons at certain events, postponing the expiration date of state-funded "health flex plans" for five years, and making it more difficult for prosecutors to try children as adults for criminal offenses. When the Republican-controlled legislature did not act on a bill authored by State Senator Dwight Bullard and State Representative Cynthia Stafford that would have raised the state's minimum wage to $10.10 an hour, Powell joined several of his colleagues in support of raising the minimum wage by living on it for a week.

Florida Senate 
In 2016, Powell ran for the Florida Senate after court-ordered redistricting created a new open seat based in West Palm Beach. He defeated Michael Steinger in the Democratic primary with 67% of the vote and defeated Republican Ron Berman in the general election, 54 to 46%.

References

External links
Florida Senate - Bobby Powell
Florida House of Representatives - Bobby Powell

1981 births
20th-century African-American people
21st-century African-American politicians
21st-century American politicians
African-American state legislators in Florida
Florida A&M University alumni
Democratic Party Florida state senators
Living people
Democratic Party members of the Florida House of Representatives
People from Riviera Beach, Florida